Mel Thorsen (1908-1971) was an American film editor active primarily in the 1930s and 1940s.

Biography 
Mel was born in Los Angeles, California, to Michael Thorsen and Agnes Frautzen, both of whom were from Norway. He married June Waddell in 1932, and the pair had a son.

Selected filmography 

 Sword of the Avenger (1948)
 Klondike Kate (1943)
 Doughboys in Ireland (1943)
 Passport to Suez (1943)
 Power of the Press (1943)
 Bullets for Bandits (1942)
 Pardon My Gun (1942)
 Junior Army (1942)
 Smith of Minnesota (1942)
 Overland to Deadwood (1942)
 Parachute Nurse (1942)
 Not a Ladies' Man (1942)
 Down Rio Grande Way (1942)
 North of the Rockies (1942)
 Bullets for Bandits (1942)
 West of Tombstone (1942)  
 The Lone Star Vigilantes (1942)  
 Roaring Frontiers (1941)
 The Son of Davy Crockett (1941)
 The Medico of Painted Springs (1941)
 Hands Across the Rockies (1941)
 The Return of Daniel Boone (1941)
 The Pinto Kid (1941)
 The Stranger from Texas (1939)

References

External links 

 

1908 births
1971 deaths
American film editors